The Dohne Merino (Dohne, El Dohne Merino) is a breed of domestic sheep from South Africa.  The breed was started in the late 1930s by the South African Department of Agriculture. It was developed by interbreeding Peppin-style Merino ewes and German Mutton Merino rams.  The Dohne Merino is a dual purpose breed providing meat and fine wool.

Characteristics
At maturity, the Dohne Merino ram weighs  and the ewe will weight . At 100 days, both sexes will weigh .

References

External links
 Dohne Merino Breed Society of South Africa
 Australian Dohne Breeders Association

Sheep breeds
Sheep breeds originating in South Africa